Nedeljko Čabrinović (20 January 1895 – 23 January 1916) was one of the Young Bosnian conspirators who planned the assassination of Archduke Franz Ferdinand on 28 June 1914. 

On the day of the assassination, Čabrinović threw a bomb that missed the car carrying the Archduke and his wife Sophie, Duchess of Hohenberg, exploding instead under the escort vehicle travelling behind. Čabrinović, 19 years old at the time, was arrested and sentenced, like assassin Gavrilo Princip, to twenty years of hard labour in the fortress of Theresienstadt in Bohemia. He fell ill and died in prison on 23 January 1916. After the war, Čabrinović’s body was exhumed and transported back to Sarajevo.

Early life
Nedeljko Čabrinović was born on 20 January 1895 in Sarajevo, Bosnia and Herzegovina at the time occupied by Austria-Hungary. Čabrinović's father had nine children and ran a café in Sarajevo. Čabrinović was a pupil at the Merchants School in Trebinje, Herzegovina, near the village where his father was originally from. In 1908 he left Trebinje to enroll at the Sarajevo Merchants School but ended up failing the final exam. Čabrinović started various apprenticeships, eventually entering the Serbian printing plant in Sarajevo where he learned typesetting for the next two years. Looking to organise the apprentices, he became at the age of fourteen the first president of the Printers' Apprentice Guild. After getting into a fight with a fellow worker, Čabrinović left his job, and as a result, his father kicked him out of the house.

Radicalisation 
Čabrinović lived and worked in various cities from Novi Sad to Karlovci and Šid working at the Socialist Printing House, he ended up in Belgrade, Serbia where he worked at the Dačić's Printing House, a printing press publishing anarchist literature. After refusing to give the Police information about the leader of the strike, he was banished from Sarajevo for five years because of his anarchistic activities. Čabrinović then went back to Belgrade but after his banishment was lifted with the help of friends and relatives, he returned to Sarajevo becoming in 1912 a full-time union member, that same year he made the acquaintance of Gavrilo Princip. Čabrinović left Sarajevo in March 1913, finding work at a Slovene printing plant in Trieste before returning to Belgrade in October 1913. 

In early 1914 he ran into Princip who was in Belgrade preparing to take his eighth-year exam at the First Belgrade High School. While visiting cafés frequented by Bosnian expatriates and Chetnik veterans of the Balkan Wars, Čabrinović and Princip learned from a newspaper cutting about Archduke Franz Ferdinand of Austria's visit to Bosnia in June. Princip convinced Čabrinović and an old school friend Trifko Grabež, the 18-year-old son of a village priest, to join him in starting a plot to attack and kill the Archduke during his official visit to Sarajevo. 
Through Djulaga Bukovac, a Bosnian Muslim veteran friend of Princip, they met Milan Ciganović, another Bosnian veteran and an associate of the Black Hand, the secretive, ultra-nationalist Serbian group responsible for the regicide of 1903. Ciganović then approached Chetnik leader Major Vojislav Tankosić, another Black Hand member of Bosnian descent, from whom they obtained weapons and received training on how to use them. 

Čabrinović, Princip, and Grabež, equipped with five Browning pistols, six grenades, and pills of cyanide left Belgrade towards the end of May 1914. They were smuggled back into Bosnia with help from Ciganović’s contacts in Narodna Odbrana. Čabrinović was told to travel alone which made him abandon his pistol before crossing into Bosnia. They arrived in Sarajevo in the first week of June, under Princip's instructions, his former roommate Danilo Ilić had recruited three more young men to join the plot: Mehmed Mehmedbašić, a Bosnian Muslim carpenter and two Bosnian Serb students: Cvetko Popović, eighteen and Vaso Čubrilović, seventeen.

Assassination of Archduke Franz Ferdinand 

Archduke Franz Ferdinand of Austria and his wife, Duchess Sophie Chotek arrived in Sarajevo by train shortly before 10 a.m. on 28 June 1914. Their car was the third car of a six-car motorcade heading towards Sarajevo Town Hall. The car's top was rolled back to allow the crowds a good view of its occupants.

All six assassins were positioned along the route. Each one had instructions to assassinate the Archduke when the royal car reached their position. The first conspirator on the route to spot the royal car was Muhamed Mehmedbašić, however, he lost his nerve and allowed the car to pass without taking action. Next was Vaso Čubrilović, armed with a bomb. He too, failed to act as the car passed him.

Čabrinović was next along the route. Just before 10:30 am, when the motorcade passed the central police station, Čabrinović standing on the river side of the boulevard, threw his M.12 Vasić hand grenade towards the car of the Archduke. However, the bomb, which had a 10-second delay, bounced off the folded hood and exploded under the car behind. seriously injuring its two occupants, Eric von Merizzi and Count Alexander von Boos-Waldeck, as well as several people in the crowd nearby.  

After Čabrinović threw his grenade, he swallowed a cyanide pill and jumped into the Miljacka river, however, the pill proved non-lethal and only made him foam at the mouth and vomit.

After Čabrinović's arrest, the Archduke's plans changed as he wished to visit the officers injured by Čabrinović's bomb. As the car in which the Archduke was travelling took a wrong turn, it slowed right in front of Princip. From just a few feet away, Princip then fired two shots from his pistol, hitting the Archduke in the jugular vein and hitting his wife, Sophie, in the abdomen, both died minutes later.

Arrest and trial 

Twenty-five men were arrested and charged while the investigation revealed that six assassins had been plotting to kill the Archduke that day. Čabrinović and Princip were found guilty of high treason by a Sarajevo court on 28 October 1914. Čabrinović confessed to his crimes and expressed regret by writing an apology letter to the Archduke's three children. In return, all three children forgave him. 

A total of sixteen sentences were given; Čabrinović, Princip, and Grabez escaped capital punishment as they were under twenty-one, the minimum age, they were sentenced instead to the maximum sentence of twenty years of hard labour, including a day without food or water once a month and confinement in the dark each year on 28 June. Čubrilović received 16 years and Popović 13 years. Mehmedbašić escaped to Montenegro, while Ilić, Veljko Čubrilović, and Miško Jovanović were hanged on 3 February 1915.

Incarceration and death 
Suffering from cold, hunger, and solitary confinement, Čabrinović's health quickly deteriorated, towards the end of 1915 he was visited by Austrian writer Franz Werfel who wrote about it in his diary. Čabrinović died on 23 January 1916. Čabrinović was one of eight of the thirteen incarcerated who died while serving their sentence, due to the inhumane conditions of their imprisonment. After the war Čabrinović’s body was exhumed and transported back to Sarajevo where he was buried in one common grave with the other conspirators.

References

Sources 
 
 
 
 
 
 
 
 
 
 

1895 births
1916 deaths
Assassination of Archduke Franz Ferdinand of Austria
Bosnia and Herzegovina people who died in prison custody
Causes of World War I
20th-century criminals
Young Bosnia
People from Sarajevo
Bosnian anarchists